Samuel H. Smith may refer to:

Samuel H. Smith (educator) (born 1940), president of Washington State University, 1985–2000
Samuel H. Smith (Latter Day Saints) (1808–44), Book of Mormon witness, missionary, and brother of Joseph Smith, Jr.
Samuel H. Smith (politician) (born 1955), member of Pennsylvania House of Representatives
Samuel Harrison Smith (printer), American journalist and newspaper publisher, founded the National Intelligencer

See also
Sam Smith (disambiguation)